Schwörer or Schworer (from Middle High German swern "to swear, affirm something under oath"; Swerer "swearer") is a German-language surname from a status name originally denoting a public official In legal matters. It may refer to:

Angie Schworer (1965), American actress
Anika Schwörer (2001), Swiss volleyball player
Hermann Schwörer (1922–2017), German politician

See also 
Swearer (disambiguation)

References 

German-language surnames
Surnames from status names